Glenea cylindrica is a species of beetle in the family Cerambycidae. It was described by Per Olof Christopher Aurivillius.

References

cylindrica